Cromwellian is an adjective relating to Oliver Cromwell (1599–1658), Lord Protector of the Commonwealth of England, and his era

Cromwellian may also refer to:

 Roundhead, a member of the Parlimamentarian side of the English Civil War against the Royalists
 Cromwellians, people from the Cromwellian Commonwealth of England
 The Cromwellian, a 1960s nightclub in London, England, UK

See also

 Cromwell (disambiguation)
 Oliver Cromwell (disambiguation)